Wenzel Storch (born 1961, Braunschweig, West Germany) is a German film director and producer.

His low-budget fantasy films tend to be critical towards the church and are filled with weird characters and settings as well as violence and bodily fluids.

Films 
 Die Reise ins Glück (Journey into bliss) (2004)
 Sommer der Liebe (1993)
 Der Glanz dieser Tage (1989)
 Autohüpfen und Ommas ärgern (1987)

References

External links
Wenzel Storch's English homepage

1961 births
Living people
Film people from Lower Saxony
Mass media people from Braunschweig